Spittal is a town in northern Northumberland, England. It is part of Berwick-upon-Tweed and is situated on the coast to the east of Tweedmouth. Spittal Beach is considered one of the best beaches in Northumberland.

The name derives from a shortened form of "hospital"; a hospital, dedicated to St Bartholomew, was built here in the Middle Ages to take care of lepers. St John's, the parish church, was built in 1867 in the Early English style, its tower being added in 1894. Prior to this, "Spittlers" had worshipped in a stable loft. There is also a nonconformist church, St Paul's, built in 1878. The village has several hotels and guest houses providing bed and breakfast, a village shop as well as a microbrewery.

Governance  
Spittal is in the parliamentary constituency of Berwick-upon-Tweed.

People
Maggie Moffat was born here and she became a suffragette and film actor.

References

External links

St John the Evangelist, a church in Spittal
Some unusual ripple marks in Carboniferous limestone near Spittal, north Northumberland

Villages in Northumberland